Kyrgyzstan competed in the 2008 Summer Olympics, held in Beijing, People's Republic of China from August 8 to August 24, 2008.

Medalists

Athletics

Men
Track & road events

Women
Track & road events

Field events

Boxing

Kyrgyzstan qualified one boxer for the Olympic boxing tournament. Asylbek Talasbayev qualified in the lightweight class at the second Asian tournament.

Fencing

Men

Judo

Shooting

Men

Swimming

Men

Taekwondo

Weightlifting

Wrestling

Men's freestyle

Men's Greco-Roman

References

Nations at the 2008 Summer Olympics
2008
Summer Olympics